Barrett & Thomson was an American architectural firm based in Raleigh, North Carolina during the first decade of the 20th century. It was a partnership of Charles W. Barrett (1869–1947) and Frank K. Thomson (1872–1961). It was established in 1900, and dissolved in 1910.

Two of the firm's various projects were selected to be on the U.S. National Register of Historic Places.

Works include:
Jarvisburg Colored School, built 1911, 7301 NC 158, Jarvisburg, North Carolina (Barrett and Thomson), NRHP-listed
Woodlawn School, N side NC 1921 0.15 mi. W of jct. with NC 1920, Mebane, North Carolina (Barrett & Thomson), NRHP-listed

References

Architects from North Carolina
American companies established in 1900
1900 establishments in North Carolina
American companies disestablished in 1910
1910 disestablishments in North Carolina
Design companies established in 1900
Design companies disestablished in 1910